Archibald Campbell (14 August 1822 – 15 September 1887) was an English cricketer.

Campbell made a single first-class appearance for Hampshire against Nottinghamshire. In the match Campbell was dismissed for a duck in Hampshire's first innings by William Clarke and remained unbeaten on 0 in Hampshire's second innings, with Hampshire losing by 39 runs.

Campbell died on 15 September 1887, although where is unknown.

External links
Archibald Campbell at Cricinfo

1822 births
1887 deaths
Cricketers from Chennai
English cricketers
Hampshire cricketers
English cricketers of 1826 to 1863